Vanoss is an unincorporated community in Pontotoc County, Oklahoma, United States. The community is located 10 miles west of Ada. The town was originally named Midland and was located a few miles away from its present location. Though little remains of the community, Vanoss Public Schools, including an elementary school, a middle school, and Vanoss High School, continue to serve the surrounding area.

Demographics

References

Unincorporated communities in Pontotoc County, Oklahoma
Unincorporated communities in Oklahoma